The 2017 European Mountain Bike Championships were held in Darfo Boario Terme, Italy, between 27 and 30 July 2017.

Medal summary

Cross-country

Cross-country eliminator

References
Official site 

European Mountain Bike Championships
2017 European MTB Championships
European MTB Championships
Mountain biking events
Euro
July 2017 sports events in Europe